T.O.P. is a 1993 album by the soul/funk group Tower of Power.  It was the last album to feature founding trumpet player and band horn arranger Greg Adams and vocalist Tom Bowes.  It also features a reunion with saxophonist Lenny Pickett, who shows up on a few tracks.

The European version of their 1987 album Power was titled TOP (not to be confused with T.O.P.).

Track listing 
All songs written by Emilio Castillo and Stephen "Doc" Kupka unless otherwise noted.

 "Soul With a Capital 'S'" - 4:59
 "It All Comes Back" - 3:55 (Adams, Neil Jason, John McCurry)
 "Please Come Back (to Stay)" - 5:28 (Castillo, Kupka, Milo)
 "The Real Deal" - 4:30
 "Come to a Decision" - 5:32 (Grillo)
 "Cruise Control" - 5:04 (Adams, Milo)
 "The Educated Bump, Part I" - 0:54
 "Mama Lied" - 3:35 (Castillo)
 "Quiet Scream" - 4:21 (Adams)
 "I Like Your Style" - 4:19 (Castillo, Kupka, Milo)
 "You" - 4:31 (Grillo, Tom Keane)
 "South of the Boulevard" - 5:59
 "Come on With It" - 4:52
 "The Educated Bump, Part II" - 1:02

Personnel 
Tower of Power
 Tom Bowes – lead vocals, backing vocals
 Nick Milo – keyboards
 Carmen Grillo – guitars, backing vocals, lead vocals (11)
 Rocco Prestia – bass
 Russ McKinnon – drums, percussion 
 Emilio Castillo – tenor saxophone, backing vocals, lead vocals (13)
 Stephen "Doc" Kupka – baritone saxophone
 Lee Thornburg – trombone, trumpet, flugelhorn, backing vocals 
 Greg Adams – trumpet, flugelhorn, horn arrangements, flugelhorn solo (6), trumpet solo (9)

Guest personnel
 Lenny Pickett – saxophone solos (2, 4, 7, 12, 13, 14)
 Brandon Fields – saxophone solo (6)
 Paul Perez – alto saxophone, tenor saxophone 
 Poncho Sanchez – congas (11, 12)

Production 
 Michael Caplan – executive producer 
 Emilio Castillo – producer
 Carmen Grillo – producer 
 Maureen Droney – recording
 Ken Kessie – recording, mixing 
 Danny Alonso – additional engineer, assistant engineer 
 John Jackson – assistant engineer
 Randy Long – assistant engineer
 Pete Magdaleno – assistant engineer
 Pat Rodman – assistant engineer
 Louie Teran – assistant engineer
 Vlado Meller – mastering 
 David Coleman – art direction 
 Nancy Donald – art direction 
 Mick Wiggins – cover illustration 
 Rocky Schneck – photography 

Studios
 Recorded at Rumbo Recorders and Skip Saylor Recording (Los Angeles, California); Pacifique Studios and Track Record Studios (North Hollywood, California); Can-Am Recorders (Tarzana, California).
 Mixed at Can-Am Recorders
 Mastered at Sony Music Studios (New York City, New York).

References

1993 albums
Epic Records albums
Tower of Power albums